Volume risk is a commodity risk which refers to the fact that a player in the commodity market has uncertain quantities of consumption or sourcing, i.e. production of the respective commodity. Examples of other circumstances which can cause large deviations from a volume forecast are weather (e.g. temperature-changes for gas consumption), the plant-availability, the collective customer outrage, but also regulatory interventions.

Another relevant cause of volatility risk in volumes and (or) prices of commodities is the financial investment in options or future contracts related to a commodity, which is achieved with the purpose of speculating, rather than hedging in order to reduce the risk of adverse price movements in assets.

Example 
An electricity retailer cannot accurately predict the demand of all house holds for a given time which is why the producer cannot forecast the precise time that a power plant will provide more electricity that consumed, even if the plant always delivers the same output of energy.

See also 
 Spreading activation

References

External links 
  (URL retrieved on Science Direct)

Market risk
Commodities